William Brenton Boggs IV,  (December 18, 1918 – July 7, 2011) was a pioneering Canadian leader in military and commercial aviation.

Early years
Born in Douglas, Arizona, United States, on December 18, 1918, William Brenton (Bill) Boggs relocated to Noranda, Quebec, with his parents in 1927. He graduated from McGill University, mechanical engineering, and became an Engineering Officer of the Royal Canadian Air Force in 1940. During his World War II service, he notably served as Senior Engineering Officer of 331 Wing of Wellington bombers dispatched to Tunisia, North Africa to support the Allied landings in Sicily and Italy, for which contributions he was appointed to the Order of the British Empire (O.B.E.) in 1944.

Civilian career
Boggs' early civilian career included positions with Trans-Canada Airlines (1945–1950) and Canadair (1950–1957) before he joined Can-Car, a subsidiary of Hawker Siddeley Canada, and became vice president of Hawker Siddeley. In 1965, he became President of de Havilland Canada (DHC). During this term, he was involved with the development of the 30-seat Dash-7 commuter aircraft. He then became President and eventually Chairman of Canada Systems Group (CSG), and, in 1983, President and CEO of The Canadian Data and Professional Service Organization.

Boggs was invited back to DHC in 1984, as Chairman, President and CEO, when that company was being prepared for privatization. When the Boeing Company bought DHC in 1986, Boggs became Vice Chairman of Boeing Canada. In 1987 he became Chairman of Field Aviation Holdings Inc. He remained there until he retired in 1995.

Honours and legacy
In addition to being made an Officer of the Order of the British Empire in 1944, Boggs was invested as an Officer into the Order of Canada in 1988. He became a Fellow of the Canadian Aeronautics and Space Institute (CASI) in 1967 and served twice as Chairman of the Aerospace Industries Association of Canada (AIAC) (1967–68; 1987–88). In 1983 he was named Fellow of the Canadian School of Management. In 2003, he was inducted into Canada's Aviation Hall of Fame.

References
 Oswald, Mary, They Led the Way, Wetaskiwin: Canada's Aviation Hall of Fame, 1999.

External links
 Hall of Fame site

1918 births
2011 deaths
American emigrants to Canada
Canadian businesspeople
McGill University Faculty of Engineering alumni
Canadian Officers of the Order of the British Empire
Officers of the Order of Canada
People from Douglas, Arizona
People from Rouyn-Noranda